Joseph Leslie Shearin (born April 16, 1960) is a former American football center and guard in the National Football League for the Los Angeles Rams, Tampa Bay Buccaneers, and Dallas Cowboys. He played college football at the University of Texas at Austin.

Early years
Shearin attended Woodrow Wilson High School, where he played as a defensive tackle. He accepted a football scholarship from the University of Texas at Austin. He suffered a mysterious illness, losing 30 pounds before being able to recover. He played as an offensive guard.

Professional career
Shearin was selected in the seventh round (181st overall) of the 1982 NFL Draft. He was released on August 27, 1985.

In 1985, he signed with the Tampa Bay Buccaneers as a free agent, playing in 10 games. He was released before the start of the 1986 season.

In 1987, he was signed as a free agent by the Dallas Cowboys. He was released on September 14.

Personal life
Following his professional football career, Shearin attended and graduated from Baylor Law School with a Juris Doctor in 1990. Currently, he is in private practice in Dallas, Texas, as a highly rated, Board Certified criminal defense attorney.

References

1960 births
Living people
Players of American football from Dallas
American football offensive linemen
Texas Longhorns football players
Los Angeles Rams players
Tampa Bay Buccaneers players
Dallas Cowboys players